Rakesh Adiga (born 7 July 1986) is an Indian actor, who works in the Kannada film industry.  Rakesh Adiga is a Bigg Boss Kannada Runner Up in the Bigg Boss Kannada (season 9). He was introduced to the film industry through the film Jhoshh in 2009. He attended high school in Janaseva Vidya Kendra residential school, Bangalore. He is also the first Kannada rapper, he started a Kannada hip-hop band with a few of his friends, which was produced by Suraj Sarja, called "Urban Lads". He also participated in Bigg Boss Kannada OTT SO1 and became 1st runner up after Roopesh Shetty and got directly selected to Bigg Boss Kannada (season 9)

Acting career
Rakesh got his first break in his debut film Jhossh, which released in 2009. The film went on to become one of the top grossers of that year and earned him good recognition. He also won Best debut actor award for Asianet Suvarna for that year. This was followed by a brief break. In 2010, he starred in a romantic film Mandahasa, which underwent much delay in release. He was next noted in Alemari (2011), where he played a villain role. He was also seen in Manasology in the same year. Subsequently, he starred as a lead actor in Parie (2012), which boasted of big names associated with it. However, the film was a failure at the box office.

Films and TV shows

Filmography

Television

References

External links 
Timesofindia.com interview

Male actors from Bangalore
Male actors in Kannada cinema
Indian male film actors
Living people
1986 births
21st-century Indian male actors